Andrés Carrascosa Coso (born 16 December 1955) is a Spanish prelate of the Catholic Church who works in the diplomatic service of the Holy See. He has been Apostolic Nuncio to Ecuador since 2017.

Biography 
Born in Cuenca, Spain on 16 December 1955, Andrés Carrascosa Coso was raised in the municipality of Alcázar del Rey. He studied at the Major Seminary of Saint Julian, and was ordained a priest of the Diocese of Cuenca on 2 July 1980. In 1981 he entered the Pontifical Ecclesiastical Academy.

On 31 July 2004, Pope John Paul II appointed Carrascosa Coso titular archbishop of Elo and Apostolic Nuncio of the Democratic Republic of the Congo. On 26 August he named him Nuncio to Gabon as well. He received his episcopal consecration on 7 October from Cardinal Angelo Sodano. 

On 12 January 2009, Pope Benedict XVI appointed Carrascosa Coso Apostolic Nuncio to Panama.  

On 22 June 2017, Pope Francis appointed Carrascosa Coso Apostolic Nuncio to Ecuador.

Decorations and honors 
At the conclusion of his time in Gabon and in recognition of his service to Gabon, Carrascosa Coso was elevated to the rank of Grand Officer of the Gabon Order of the Equatorial Star.

Panama recognized Carrascosa Coso's service as nuncio to Panama by awarding him the National Decoration of the Order "Vasco Núñez de Balboa", in the Degree of "Grand Cross".

See also
 List of heads of the diplomatic missions of the Holy See

References

External links 

 

Living people
1955 births
Apostolic Nuncios to the Republic of the Congo
Apostolic Nuncios to Gabon
Apostolic Nuncios to Panama
Apostolic Nuncios to Ecuador